The Albanians in France constitute an ethnic minority of the country as immigrants. The most Albanians came from Kosovo, North Macedonia, Montenegro, Turkey, Italy and Greece.

History
The Confederation of Albanians in France is an organization of emigrants in France. It was quickly registered by the French authorities. It is in the process that some Albanians were personally addressed by the organization in Albania, either out of fear or rejection of the content, police dangerous letters of their will. A so-called Balkan committee, most of which had personal acquaintance with Albania and Greece, expressed in January 1941 "its deep sympathy with the Albanian people" strongly condemned the Italian aggression and demanded the restoration of full Albanian independence.

Notable people

History and politics
 Princess Senije Zogu  –  Albanian princess
 Adile Zogu  –  Albanian princess
 Perikli Teta  –  Albanian aircraft engineer and politician

University
 Albert Doja  –  Social anthropologist, Member of the National Albanian Academy of Sciences and French University Professor of Anthropology at the University of Lille.

Cinema
 Arben Bajraktaraj  –  Albanian actor

Arts and entertainment
 Angelin Preljocaj  –  French dancer and choreographer of contemporary dance
 Erza Muqoli  –  French singer

Writers
 Cizia Zykë (c. 1949–2011) –  French writer 
 Klara Buda  –  French Albanian journalist and writer
 Ismail Kadare (born 1936)  –  Albanian novelist and poet, winner of the 2005 Man Booker International Prize, the 2009 Prince of Asturias Award, and the 2015 Jerusalem Prize.

Sports
 Lorik Cana  –  Albanian former professional footballer
 Albin Hodža  –  French footballer

See also 
 Albania–France relations

References

France
France
Ethnic groups in France
Immigration to France by country of origin
French people of Albanian descent